"Barren Ground" is a song written by Bruce Hornsby and John Hornsby for the 1990 album, A Night on the Town, by Bruce Hornsby and the Range.

Daryl Braithwaite version

"Barren Ground" was covered by Australian singer-songwriter Daryl Braithwaite and released as the second single from his fourth studio album, Taste the Salt in January 1994. 

Simon Hussey won the ARIA awards for Engineer of the Year for his work on this track and "The World as It Is" at the ARIA Music Awards of 1994.

Track listing
CD single
 "Barren Ground" – 4:42
 "The Other Side" – 4:10
 "The Horses" (acoustic) – 4:17

Charts

References

1990 songs
1994 singles
Songs written by Bruce Hornsby
Columbia Records singles
Song recordings produced by Simon Hussey